Ruslan Musavirovich Yarkhamov (born 18 April 1988) is a former Russian professional football player.

Club career
He played in the Russian Football National League for FC Baltika Kaliningrad in 2007.

References

External links
 

1988 births
Footballers from Moscow
Living people
Russian footballers
Association football midfielders
FC Torpedo Moscow players
FC Baltika Kaliningrad players
FC Chertanovo Moscow players